Stephan Straub (born 25 January 1971 in Saarbrücken) is a German former professional footballer who played as a goalkeeper.

External links
 

1971 births
Living people
German footballers
Alemannia Aachen players
Association football goalkeepers
1. FC Saarbrücken players
SV Eintracht Trier 05 players
SV Waldhof Mannheim players
Bundesliga players
2. Bundesliga players
Sportspeople from Saarbrücken
West German footballers
Footballers from Saarland